Woolhampton Lock is a lock on the Kennet and Avon Canal, in the village of Woolhampton in the English county of Berkshire.

Woolhampton Lock lies on the stretch of the canal that was originally built between 1718 and 1723, under the supervision of the engineer John Hore of Newbury, as the Kennet Navigation. This navigation is an improved river navigation rather than a true canal, and consists of sections of the natural riverbed of the River Kennet alternating with artificially created lock cuts and locks.

Woolhampton Lock is at the downstream end of an artificial lock cut, and the river and lock cut rejoin at the foot of the lock. Just to the east and downstream of this, the navigable river is crossed by a swing bridge carrying the road from the centre of Woolhampton village to the nearby village of Brimpton. Craft are warned to enter or leave the lock and pass under the open bridge in a single movement, since the current from the incoming river tends to push boats off course and there is nowhere to moor between the lock and bridge.  Adjacent to this bridge is the Row Barge public house.

See also

List of locks on the Kennet and Avon Canal

References

External links

Woolhampton and Heale's Locks on www.tonycanalpics.co.uk

Locks of Berkshire
Locks on the Kennet and Avon Canal